Remainder advertising (also known as remnant or last minute advertising) refers to the advertising space or time slots that a media company has been unable to sell.

Advertising time and space is a perishable commodity. If it is not sold, it is lost, used for a "house ad", or given away for public service announcements or some other non-revenue producing filler. However, instead of taking a loss, media outlets will often take far less than their usual retail fees to unload their remnant space or time. This means advertisers can buy what is typically expensive media for a great deal less than normal. Although the space and/or time is sold at a steeply discounted rate, media sellers benefit as well, monetizing inventory that would have otherwise gone to waste.

Companies that want to take advantage of last minute ad space must make it easy for the media source to work with them and use their ad. Because these ad spaces come up at the last minute, media companies often would rather simply offer the opportunity to their larger advertisers because they have ready budgets, ad departments that can create an ad quickly, and managers that can make a decision swiftly. If newcomers want these sorts of opportunities to come their way, they must be as easy to work with as the large advertisers. Newcomers should let their ad reps know they are interested, and put some money aside and have an ad ready to go quickly. Because the space is purchased last minute, advertisers must have the capability to make quick decisions as to creative unit(s), and have the ability to swiftly measure how these last minute buys fit into and/or affects their budget. One caveat with respect to remnant ad buys in radio, TV, and internet is that this advertising space and/or time is completely preemptable.  Preemptable rates can cause competition between advertisers when bidding for general market advertising space as well as remnant advertising space.  Whoever bids the higher amount with the media company wins the surplus inventory.

Last minute advertising is a means to stretch a company's advertising budget a long way, but sometimes it is not the easiest way to operate because it is so last minute. Companies must be prepared to act quickly.

Differences by type of media

The way in which advertisers are best able to use last minute advertising to their advantage depends upon the type of media:

Newspapers
Because they are often published daily and have a fairly set format, newspapers offer plenty of remnant space opportunities. One success factor, with newspapers especially, is advertisers' willingness to accept smaller remnant ads, because those are the ones that may be needed to fill out the paper.

Magazines
One of the great remnant opportunities lies with national magazines in the United States. Such magazines print regional editions, and sell regional ads. If they fail to sell all of the regional ads (which is quite common), or sell an odd number, their unsold inventory is an opportunity for the advertiser.

Yet, even smaller magazines offer remnant advertising. Magazines create their editorial content based upon, among other things, the amount of advertising sold. But sometimes advertisers back out, or end up going with smaller ads, or miss a deadline, or the magazine ends up with extra content, all of which creates an opportunity for another advertiser who can come in at the last minute.

Radio
Radio is one of the best media for remnant buys because—unlike print media which can be expanded and contracted to a certain extent as needed—radio advertising is finite. There are a fixed number of spots in one hour that must be filled. So, even more than other types of media, advertisers have a better chance of getting discounted ad space on the radio. And the discounts can range from 25% to 75% off the retail price.

Television
The ever-expanding proliferation of television stations—be they network, cable, or satellite—is good news for advertisers. There is plenty of television remnant space to be had and discounts can be as high as 90% off the rate card.

Outdoors
Everywhere you look you see billboards that go unfilled. Although this is not last minute advertising in the strictest sense because often these spaces go unfilled for a long time, it is a major form of remnant advertising and should not be ignored by companies looking for opportunities to advertise especially for short bursts.

Sponsorship
Many sporting and other events are unable to get the advertisers that they would like. This is another form of remnant advertising. While large sporting events such as the Super Bowl or Formula One sell their advertising and sponsorship opportunities with ease, there are many sports and sportsmen of a less glamorous nature that need to raise funds quickly and at the last minute.

Online advertising
Online, because of its real-time delivery model, is, in theory, a perfect place to execute remnant inventory deals. With historically low sell-through on a site or ad and page impressions increase dramatically and unexpectedly, having a hopper filled with remnant inventory deals is a great way to ensure you're maximizing the ad revenue off of your inventory. Often, these deals are managed over a network of sites from one centralized ad server or ad system. Cheaper deals, often CPA (Cost per Action) or CPC (Cost per Click), will often run this way and will compete against one another on a normalized basis of CPM (effective cost per thousand [impressions]).  As these impressions, by definition, are based on remnant inventory, impression levels are not guaranteed and advertisers will only pay for what they get.

External links 
 https://www.usatoday.com/money/smallbusiness/columnist/strauss/2006-01-16-remnant_x.htm

Advertising